Searching for Skylab - America's Forgotten Triumph is a 2019 documentary about the 1970s American space station Skylab. It was written by Carl Alessi and directed by Dwight Steven-Boniecki and partly crowdfunded.

Searching for Skylab was created to bring attention to the important role Skylab played in the development of human spaceflight programs. On Skylab, Steven-Boniecki said "hundreds of hours of video and audio recordings exist from it, yet it is unlikely that you've seen or heard much of it."

A preview of the first working version of Searching for Skylab was screened at Spacefest, Tucson, AZ on July 5, 2018 to a crowd of space experts, astronauts and their families. Following a great reception, Boniecki completed filming and got the movie ready for its release on the 45th anniversary of the return of the last Skylab crew to Earth on February 8, 2019.

Shortly before completion, a sneak peek of the movie’s working version was presented in November 2018 at the Science Late Show at the Kosmos Kino in Zürich.

The film premiered at the U.S. Space and Rocket Center in Huntsville, Alabama, on February 8, 2019, with Skylab astronauts Jack Lousma (Skylab 3) and Ed Gibson (Skylab 4) in attendance. The movie was released online in March 2019 and is available on video on demand.

Accuracy 
The film is regarded by experts as being extremely accurate. Correct mission footage is shown in all instances of the movie. Audience members often stated: „It was the most accurate space documentary.” The production team made a point of highlighting this during pre-production via interviews conducted online. Searching for Skylab has been praised by writers for various spaceflight enthusiast communities.

Production 
Apart from several mission-specific 30-minute reports from the early 1970’s, no attempt had been made to thoroughly document the Skylab program since the last flight returned in 1974. A discussion between Dwight Steven-Boniecki, who at that point had been working on compiling the Skylab Mission Reports for Apogee Books, and his wife Alexandra Steven-Boniecki highlighted how crucial it was to make such a film having researched “many hundreds of hours of video” and listened to “many hundreds of hours of audio”, feeling that “he had to preserve it for future generations in a story that they would like to hear".

Soundtrack 
German band, 10 Cent Janes were approached to compose the title song for the film. Dwight had met the lead singer of the band, Shaun Behrens, on a flight from Frankfurt to New Delhi in 2013, and following the band’s release of the CD „Between Troubled Cities“, felt the group could deliver the style required for the film. „Horizon Riders“ was released February 2018.

Release 
The world premiere of Searching for Skylab took place at the US Space and Rocket Center in Huntsville, Alabama on February 8, 2019. In attendance were, Jack Lousma (SL-3 Pilot) and Ed Gibson (SL-4 Science Pilot), along with Alan Bean’s former wife, Sue and daughter, Amy. Huntsville Engineers John Reaves, Roy Logston, and Willie Weaver. Owen Garriott (SL-3 Science Pilot), his son Richard (who also flew in space on Soyuz TMA-13/TMA-12), and Jerry Carr (SL-4 Commander) joined via Skype. Herb Baker, son of seamstress Alyene Baker, who sewed the parasol used to rescue Skylab, and historian Jay Chladek, participated in the panel held following the screening.

The film had its Australian premiere in Esperance, Australia on July 11, 2019. This was in conjunction with the town’s 40th Anniversary of Skylab's impact in 1979. Esperance Shire reports noted that the 40th Anniversary events had increase tourism by 4-fold.

The film was made available for digital download on March 1, 2019. Releases on iTunes and Google Play were thrown into jeopardy following the collapse and ultimate bankruptcy of aggregator Distribber.

Critical response 
Emily Carney, a writer for the National Space Society, wrote that the film was a "treasure trove of as-yet-unseen archival footage" and that the film helped dispel long held myths about the Skylab space station. A writer for Spaceflight Insider also praised the film saying "If you never flew into space yourself and you’d like to experience what it takes to be an astronaut, you ought to find out watching the film. It’s absolutely thrilling". Richard Speed from The Register, a UK based online magazine, stated "I found the film very enjoyable and would recommend it to anyone with even a passing interest in the space programme. Coming in at just over an hour-and-a-half, it is neither too drawn out or too brief." Guido Schwarz, founder of the Swiss Space Museum noted "Thanks to his extensive research and discussions with experts and astronauts around Skylab, he has created a fascinating documentary film about the first American space station that was overshadowed by Apollo." The movie was selected by space enthusiasts as one of the “best space documentaries around” next to the CNN Films – production of the film Apollo 11.

Awards 
Winner of the "Best Documentary" at Eastern Europe Film Festival 

Winner of "First Documentary Film" at Sweden Film Awards - October 2020 

Winner of "Best Director" for Dwight Steven-Boniecki at Salt House Creative Film Festival - December 2020 

Semi Finalist for "Best Science Film" at the Vienna Science Film Festival 2020 

Semi Finalist for "Best Documentary Feature " at the Rome Prisma Film Festival 2020 

Nominee for "Best Documentary" at the Scene Festival 2021 

Winner of "Best International Documentary"at the Channel Islands Film Awards 2021 

Winner of "Best First Time Director" at the Prague Monthly International Film Festival - February 2021 

Award for "Best Editing" at the Art Film Awards, Skopje, North Macedonia - February 2021 

Winner of "Best Documentary Feature: Dimond Award" at the Mindfield Film Festival, Albuquerque, New Mexico, USA - February 2021 

Winner of "Best Documentary" at The Hollywood Art and Movie Awards - January 2021

References

External links

Film website

Skylab program
Documentary films about the space program of the United States
Films about astronauts
Films about NASA
2010s English-language films